Graziano Rossi (born 14 March 1954 in Pesaro) is an Italian former Grand Prix motorcycle road racer. He is the father of 9 times motorcycle World Champion Valentino Rossi.

He began racing in the World Championship in 1977  riding a Suzuki in the 500cc class. He had his best year in 1979 when he earned three victories and five podiums in the 250 class aboard a Morbidelli, finishing third in points. He then raced in Touring cars from 1989 to 1993.

Motorcycle Grand Prix results

(key) (Races in bold indicate pole position; races in italics indicate fastest lap)

References

Valentino Rossi
1954 births
Living people
250cc World Championship riders
500cc World Championship riders
Italian motorcycle racers
People from Pesaro
Sportspeople from the Province of Pesaro and Urbino